Lobnitz & Company was a Scottish shipbuilding company located at Renfrew on the River Clyde, west of the Renfrew Ferry crossing and east of the confluence with the River Cart. The Lobnitz family  lived at Chapeltoun House in East Ayrshire.  The company built dredgers, floating docks, fishing boats, tugs and workboats.

History
The company was descended from Coulburn Lobnitz & Company, established in 1874, and the adjacent shipyard of William Simons & Co, established in 1860.  Both builders specialised in the construction of dredgers and hopper barges.  The two companies amalgamated in 1957 as Simons-Lobnitz Ltd.  Faced with declining business the Renfrew yard finally closed in 1964 after some 1300 dredgers as well as barges and tugs had been built at the site.  One late example survives: SS Shieldhall was built as a Clyde sludge boat in 1954 with reciprocating steam engines, and now operates as a pleasure cruiser on the Solent. Also still afloat is the William C. Daldy a steam tug operating as a pleasure vessel in Auckland, New Zealand, where she sailed from the Clyde in 1935/6.

Naval warship construction
In addition, over sixty minor war vessels (sloops, corvettes, minesweepers and boom defence vessels) were constructed by Lobnitz at Renfrew between 1915 and 1945 for the Royal Navy.  One of these, HMS Saxifrage, was built in 1918 as a Flower-class sloop, which was the first class of purpose-built anti-submarine warships.  She was renamed HMS President in 1921 and served as the London Division Royal Naval Reserve training ship until 1988, before being sold into private ownership. She survives near Blackfriars Bridge on the Victoria Embankment of the River Thames in London, as one of only three remaining First World War British warships.

Lobnitz Marine Holdings
The company's goodwill and orders were purchased in 1964 by Alexander Stephen and Sons, which merged into Upper Clyde Shipbuilders in 1968. Simons-Lobnitz re-emerged from the collapse of UCS in 1971 and continues to operate as a marine engineering and naval architecture consultancy based in Paisley, now called Lobnitz Marine Holdings.

External links 
 Lobnitz Marine Holdings

Companies based in Renfrewshire
Defunct shipbuilding companies of Scotland
British companies established in 1860
1860 establishments in Scotland
River Clyde
1964 disestablishments in Scotland
British companies disestablished in 1964
Renfrew
Manufacturing companies established in 1860